The list of winners below is generated using the Roll of Honour from the Ulster LGFA website  and other sources.

Donaghmoyne are the 2019 champions, having won their 12th Ulster senior title.

Key

By year

By Club

By County

Ulster not represented from 1984-1990

References

Ladies' Gaelic football competitions
Ladies